Zhihe Subdistrict  is a subdistrict situated in Chuanying District, Jilin City, Jilin Province, China. , it administers the following four residential neighborhoods:
Youhao Community
Yueshan Road Community
Er'er'er Community
Beisi Community

See also
List of township-level divisions of Jilin

References

Township-level divisions of Jilin
Jilin City